Mark Mills is a British writer of screenplays and novels. His first screenplay was the BAFTA-nominated short film One Night Stand starring Jemma Redgrave and James Purefoy in 1993; this won Mills a Best Screenplay' award at the Angers European First Film Festival in 1995.

Mills's first novel was Amagansett, later reissued under the title The Whaleboat House published in 2004; this won him the award for Best Crime Novel by a Debut Author at the Crime Writers' Association Award. His second novel, The Savage Garden, was published in 2006. His third novel, The Information Officer, was published in April, 2009.

Work

External links 
 Interview with Mark Mills
 Mark Mills on FantasticFiction.co.uk
 
 http://www.markmills.org.uk

British writers
Year of birth missing (living people)
Living people
People educated at Lancing College